Karel Dormans (born 3 June 1975, in Weert) is a Dutch rower. He finished 4th in the men's lightweight coxless four at the 2004 Summer Olympics.

References 
 
 

1975 births
Living people
Dutch male rowers
Rowers at the 2004 Summer Olympics
Olympic rowers of the Netherlands
Sportspeople from Weert
World Rowing Championships medalists for the Netherlands
21st-century Dutch people
20th-century Dutch people